David Stuart Lynne Thomas (19 September 1920 – 21 April 1993), known as Lyn or Dai Thomas, was a Welsh professional footballer who played as a forward in the Football League for Brighton & Hove Albion.

Life and career
Thomas was born in Swansea in 1920. He was a schoolboy international, and joined Swansea Town from Abercregan Juniors in 1942. During the Second World War, he made guest appearances for clubs including Accrington Stanley, Blackpool, Swindon Town, Wrexham, and Dundee United. He never played first-team football for Swansea, and signed for Brighton & Hove Albion of the Third Division South in 1947. Although he scored on debut, Thomas soon dropped out of consideration, but came back into the team on the wing, and finished the season with four goals from fourteen appearances. He spent the following season in the reserves, and left the club on a free transfer at the end of it, going on to play for Kent League clubs Folkestone Town and (very briefly) Margate. Thomas died in Waltham Forest, London, in 1993 at the age of 72.

References

1920 births
1993 deaths
Footballers from Swansea
Welsh footballers
Wales schools international footballers
Association football forwards
Swansea City A.F.C. players
Brighton & Hove Albion F.C. players
Folkestone F.C. players
Margate F.C. players
Accrington Stanley F.C. (1891) wartime guest players
Blackpool F.C. wartime guest players
Swindon Town F.C. wartime guest players
Wrexham F.C. wartime guest players
Dundee United F.C. wartime guest players
English Football League players